A list of the earliest films produced in the Cinema of Austria between 1907 and 1919 ordered by year of release. In view of more than 300 films produced in these years the list is incomplete. For an alphabetical list of articles on Austrian films see :Category:Austrian films.

1907-1914

1915

1916

1917

1918

1919

External links
 Austrian film at the Internet Movie Database
 

1900s
Films
Films
Austria
Austria